An IOU is an acknowledgment of debt.

IOU may also refer to:

Music
 I.O.U. (album), album by British jazz fusion guitarist Allan Holdsworth,  1982
 "I.O.U." (Freeez song), 1983
 "I.O.U." (Jimmy Dean song), 1976
 "I.O.U." (Mike Shinoda song), 2018
 "I.O.U." (Lee Greenwood song), 1983
 "I.O.U", 2020 song by NCT from NCT 2020 Resonance Pt. 2
 I.O.U. (hip hop group)
 I.O.U., album by Gregory Isaacs, 1982

Organizations
 Investor-owned utility, a supplier of basic services
 Intercultural Open University Foundation, a distance education institution
 Islamic Online University, an online, distance-learning university founded by Bilal Philips
 International Ornithologists' Union, new name of the International Ornithological Committee

Other uses
 Interdependent Occupational Unit, the monetary unit of the Kingdom of Lovely in the British television series How to Start Your Own Country
 GURPS Illuminati University, a sourcebook for the GURPS role-playing game
 Intersection over union, a measure for the similarity of two sets, which is also known as Jaccard index

See also
 IOYOU, former name of the Irish pop vocal group Westlife
 I Owe You, debut studio album by American contemporary gospel singer Kierra "Kiki" Sheard
 AEIOU (disambiguation)